Eriogonum argillosum is a species of wild buckwheat known by the common names clay buckwheat, clay-loving buckwheat, and Coast Range wild buckwheat. It is endemic to California, where it is known only from San Benito and Monterey Counties. It grows on clay substrates, often of serpentine origin. This is an annual herb up to 30 to 60 centimeters tall with a basal patch of oval-shaped, woolly leaves and a naked stem. The top of the stem is occupied by the inflorescence, a cyme with several clusters of tiny white or pink flowers.

References

External links
  Calflora Database: Eriogonum argillosum  (Clay buckwheat,  Clay loving buckwheat)
Jepson Manual eFlora (TJM2) treatment of Eriogonum argillosum
UC Photos gallery: Eriogonum argillosum

argillosum
Endemic flora of California
Natural history of the California chaparral and woodlands
Natural history of the California Coast Ranges
Natural history of Monterey County, California
Natural history of San Benito County, California
~
Taxa named by John Thomas Howell
Flora without expected TNC conservation status